There are two classes of USCG Inland Buoy Tenders.

The 100-foot Class Inland Buoy Tenders consists of the following boats:
USCGC Bluebell (WLI-313);  Portland, Oregon, (commissioned 28 September 1944) 
USCGC Buckthorn (WLI-642); Sault Ste. Marie, Michigan, (commissioned 18 August 1963) 

The 65-foot Class Inland Buoy Tenders consists of the following boats:
USCGC Bayberry (WLI-65400); Oak Island (North Carolina) , (commissioned, June 1954)  
USCGC Elderberry (WLI-65401); Petersburg, Alaska, (commissioned, June 1954)

See also
USCG coastal buoy tender
USCG inland construction tender
USCG seagoing buoy tender

External links 

Buoy Tender Inland